Chiton olivaceus, the green chiton,  is a species of chiton, a marine polyplacophoran mollusk in the family Chitonidae, the typical chitons.

Description
These large chitons have carinate plates with strongs ribs. The shell is oblong and oval. In the front and rear plates ribs have a radial pattern. The intermediate valves show a sharp beak and rounded sutural plates. Colors are very variable, ranging from olive-gray (hence the common name) to yellow-brown, sometimes black, orange, red or yellow. The girdle surrounding all of the valves is quite large and covered by bristles and scales.

The teeth of these grazers of algae  are composed of magnetite, the hardest material usable by a living being.

Distribution
This species is common in the Mediterranean sea around Italy and Greece, but can also to be found in the nearby Atlantic Ocean.

Habitat
Chiton olivaceus occur on a solid substrate, particularly stones and rocks, in the zones of sweeping of the waves, at a low depth.

References

Chitonidae
Chitons described in 1797